The open Hobie 16 competition at the 2006 Asian Games in Doha was held from 5 to 13 December 2006.

Schedule
All times are Arabia Standard Time (UTC+03:00)

Results
Legend
DNC — Did not come to the starting area

References

External links
Official website

Open Hobie 16